Jeremy James Siegel (born November 14, 1945) is the Russell E. Palmer Professor of Finance at the Wharton School of the University of Pennsylvania in Philadelphia, Pennsylvania. Siegel comments extensively on the economy and financial markets. He appears regularly on networks including CNN, CNBC and NPR, and writes regular columns for Kiplinger's Personal Finance and Yahoo! Finance. Siegel's paradox is named after him.

Biography
Siegel was born into a family of Jews in Chicago, Illinois, and graduated from Highland Park High School.  He majored in mathematics and economics as an undergraduate at Columbia University, graduating in 1967, and obtained a Ph.D. from MIT in 1971. At MIT he studied under Paul Samuelson and Robert Solow, both Nobel Prize winners.

He taught at the University of Chicago for four years before moving to the Wharton School of the University of Pennsylvania.

As of 2007, Siegel was advisor to WisdomTree Investments, a sponsor of exchange-traded funds; he owned about 2% of the company, which was then worth an estimated $700 million.

Investing advice
In his books Stocks for the Long Run (1998) and The Future for Investors (2005), Siegel outlines his investing theories and advice.

He recommends against holding bonds, arguing their long-term performance tends to be negative after inflation. Siegel's position on bonds has been disputed, with critics proposing his data is flawed due to use of unreliable information from earlier sources.

For stocks, Siegel recommends relying primarily or exclusively on index funds when possible, as active management tends to underperform market averages over long periods. (When he wrote in the late 1990s and early 2000's, index funds were not necessarily available in 401k plans but have become more popular since then.) He is not opposed to holding a small portion of the portfolio in single stocks, provided their selection is prudent. 

For all stocks or investment options, Siegel advise following a "D-I-V" mnemonic as a guideline: prioritizing dividends, international, and valuation. His research found dividend-paying stocks tend to offer superior long-term performance, as they are associated with profitable mature companies that hold up well during bear markets and recessions, and are also more likely to be reasonably valued. He has endorsed the Dogs of the Dow method, of holding the highest-dividend stocks in the Dow Jones Industrial Average. Siegel recommends substantial international stock holdings, up to 40-50%, to avoid home country bias and obtain a broader variety of options. For valuation, Siegel recommends stocks or indexes that are fairly valued or undervalued while avoiding sectors that are overvalued or trendy, as they tend to offer poor long-term results. He calls this phenomenon the "growth trap" and notes that fast-growing companies, industries or economies are not necessarily good investments.

Siegel's academic research showing dividend-paying companies tend to offer superior long-term performance with lower risk has influenced the construction of indexes used for WisdomTree Investments, a provider of exchange traded funds. After the dot com bubble of the late 1990s and early 2000's Siegel became somewhat skeptical of the prevailing use of market capitalization for constructing index funds, and thus helped develop fundamental indexing.

TV programs
He has been a frequent guest on the business TV program Kudlow & Company on CNBC, hosted by Lawrence Kudlow. Siegel, like Kudlow, tends to favor supply-side economics. Siegel is also a lifelong friend of Robert Shiller, an economist at the Yale School of Management, whom Siegel has known since their MIT graduate school days. Siegel and Shiller have frequently debated each other on TV about the stock market and its future returns, and have become financial media celebrities, regularly appearing on CNBC.

Criticisms

IPO debate
Siegel has said that Initial Public Offerings, stock sold by new companies, typically disappoint. In his The Future for Investors: Why the Tried and the True Triumph Over the Bold and the New (Crown Business, 2005), Siegel analyzed 9,000 IPOs between 1968 and 2003 and concluded that IPOs consistently underperformed a small-cap index in nearly four out of five cases. Others disagree.

2000 bullishness
Some have criticized Professor Siegel for being bullish on the stock market back in 2000. In a BusinessWeek interview in May 2000 when asked about the stock market, he replied:
"Seven percent per year [average] real returns on stocks is what I find over nearly two centuries. I don't see persuasive reasons why it should be any different from that over the intermediate run. In the short run, it could be almost anything."
That being said, Professor Siegel was correct when he also stated in the same interview:
"I have voiced my concern about the technology sector, and I sometimes advise people to shade down from that sector relative to its percentage in the [Standard & Poor's 500-stock index.] I really am concerned with these companies that have p-e ratios of 90, 100, and above. I still think stocks, as a diversified portfolio, are the best long-run investment. I will say that indexed bonds at 4% are an attractive hedge at the present time. To get a 4% real rate of return, although it's not as high as 6.5% to 7% that we talked about in stocks, as a guaranteed rate of return is certainly comforting against any inflation."
On March 14, 2000, The Wall Street Journal published an opinion piece by Siegel titled: "Big-Cap Tech Stocks Are a Sucker Bet". The piece issued warnings against investing in some of the hottest technology stocks during the dot com bubble.

Bibliography
Books
 The Future for Investors: Why the Tried and the True Triumph Over the Bold and the New (2005).
 Stocks for the Long Run: The Definitive Guide to Financial Market Returns and Long-Term Investment Strategies, McGraw-Hill (1994), .
 Revolution on Wall Street: The Rise and Decline of the New York Stock Exchange (1993).
 

Academic journal publications
“Risk, Interest Rates, and the Forward Exchange,” Quarterly Journal of Economics, 86 (2), May 1972, pp. 303–9; 
“Reply,” Quarterly Journal of Economics, 89 (1), February, 1975, pp. 173–5.
“Stability and the Keynesian and Classical Macroeconomic Systems,” Journal of Monetary Economics, 2 (2), April 1976, pp. 257–66.
“Indexation, the Risk-Free Asset, and Capital Market Equilibrium,” (with Jerold Warner) Journal of Finance, 32 (4), September 1977, pp. 1101–8.
“The Gibson Paradox and Historical Movements in Real Interest Rates,” (with Robert Shiller) Journal of Political Economy, 85 (5), October 1977, pp. 891–907.
“Notes on Optimal Taxation and the Optimal Rate of Inflation,” Journal of Monetary Economics, 4(2), April 1978, pp. 297–305.
“Inflation-Induced Distortion in Government and Private Saving Statistics,” Review of Economics and Statistics, 61 (2), April 1979, pp. 83–90.
“Bank Regulation and Macroeconomic Stability” (with Anthony Santomero), American Economic Review, 71 (1), March 1981, pp. 39–53.
“Inflation, Bank Profits, and Government Seignorage,” American Economic Review, 71 (2), May 1981, pp. 352–5.
“Bank Reserves and Financial Stability,” Journal of Finance, 35 (5), December 1981, pp. 1073–85.
“Monetary Stabilization and the Informational Value of Monetary Aggregates,” Journal of Political Economy, 90 (1), February 1982, pp. 176–80.
“A General Equilibrium Money and Banking Paradigm” (with Anthony Santomero), Journal of Finance, 37 (2), May 1982, pp. 357–69.
“Technological Change and the Super-Neutrality of Money,” Journal of Money, Credit, and Banking, 15 (3), August 1983, pp. 362–7.
“Operational Interest Rate Rules,” American Economic Review, 73 (5), December 1983, pp. 1102–10.
“The Mortgage Refinancing Decision,” Housing Finance Review, 3 (1), January 1984, pp. 91–7.
“Money Supply Announcements and Interest Rates: Does Monetary Policy Matter?” Journal of Monetary Economics, 15 (2), March 1985, pp. 163–76.
“The Application of the DCF Method for Determining the Cost of Capital,” Financial Management, 14 (1), Spring 1985, pp. 46–53.
“Deposit Deregulation and Monetary Policy” (with Anthony Santomero) in Carnegie Rochester Conference Series on Public Policy, Volume 24, Spring 1986, pp. 179–224.
“Are Money, Growth and Inflation Related to Government Deficits? Evidence for Ten Industrialized Economies” (with Aris Protopapadakis), Journal of International Money and Finance, 6, March 1987, pp. 31–48.
“Does It Pay Stock Investors to Forecast the Business Cycle?” Journal of Portfolio Management, 18 (1), Fall 1991, pp. 27–34.
“The Real Rate of Interest from 1800-1990: A Study of the U.S. and the U.K.: Journal of Monetary Economics, 29 (2), April 1992, pp. 227-52.
“The Equity Premium, Stock and Bond Returns Since 1802,” Financial Analysts Journal, 48(1), January/February 1992, pp. 28–38; winner of the 1992 Graham and Dodd Scroll Award.
“Equity Risk Premia, Corporate Profit Forecasts, and Investor Sentiment around the Stock Crash of October 1987,” Journal of Business, 65 (4), October 1992, pp. 557–70.
“The Theory of Security Pricing and Market Structure” (with Marshall Blume), Journal of Financial Markets, Institutions, and Instruments, 1 (3), August 1992, pp. 3–58; with a Foreword by Paul Samuelson
“Long Term Characteristics of Income Producing Real Estate” (with Joseph Gyourko), Journal of Real Estate Finance, 11 (1) Spring 1994, pp. 14–22.
“The Nifty-Fifty Revisited: Do Growth Stocks Ultimately Justify Their Price?” Journal of Portfolio Management, 21 (4), summer 1995, pp. 8–20.
“Anomalies: The Equity Premium Puzzle” (with Richard Thaler), Journal of Economic Perspectives, 11 (1), Winter 1997, pp. 191–200.
“The Shrinking Equity premium,” lead article in The Journal of Portfolio Management, vol. 26, 1, Fall 1999, 10-17.
The Rise in Stock Valuations and Future Equity Returns, Lead article, The Journal of Investment Consulting, Vol 5, No. 1, June/July 2002, pp. 9–19 
“What Is an Asset Price Bubble? An Operational Definition,” European Financial Management, Vol. 9 No. 1, 2003, pp. 11–24, 
“Perspectives on the Equity Risk Premium,” Financial Analysts Journal, v. 61 (1), November/December 2005, pp. 61–73 reprinted in Bold Thinking on Investment Management,” Ed., Rodney N. Sullivan, 2005, pages 202-217, CFA Institute
“The Long Term Returns on the Original S&P 500 Firms,” (with Jeremy Schwartz), Financial Analysts Journal, v. 61 (1), January/February 2006. pp. 18–31.

Awards 
1994: Best Business School Professor in worldwide ranking, Business Week

2002: Lindback Award for outstanding university teaching

1996, 2005: Helen Kardon Moss Anvil Award for outstanding MBA teaching

2005: Nicholas Molodovsky Award by the Chartered Financial Analysts Institute to “those individuals who have made outstanding contributions of such significance as to change the direction of the profession and to raise it to higher standards of accomplishment.”

Notes

External links
 JeremySiegel.com where the "Wizard of Wharton" weighs in on the markets, the economy and investment strategies.
 Bloomberg Article: "The Shiller & Siegel Show"
 EricTyson.com Summary of global investing perspectives in "Stocks for the Long Run"

1945 births
21st-century American economists
20th-century American Jews
University of Pennsylvania faculty
Living people
Supply-side economists
Wharton School of the University of Pennsylvania faculty
Columbia College (New York) alumni
Massachusetts Institute of Technology alumni
21st-century American Jews
University of Chicago Booth School of Business faculty